Hirose may refer to:

Hirose Electric Group, a Japanese company specializing in the manufacture of connectors
Hirose (surname), a Japanese surname
Hirose-gawa, a river in Sendai, Japan
Koichi Hirose (JoJo's Bizarre Adventure character)